Capão da Canoa is a municipality in the state of Rio Grande do Sul, Brazil. With miles of beaches, Capão da Canoa is a popular beach resort for residents of nearby Porto Alegre.

See also
List of municipalities in Rio Grande do Sul

References

Populated coastal places in Rio Grande do Sul
Municipalities in Rio Grande do Sul